Third Empire may refer to:
Third German Empire or Third Reich, a common name for Nazi Germany (1933–1945)
Das Dritte Reich ("The Third Empire"), a 1923 novel by A. Moeller-Bruck which influenced the Nazi Party
Third Bulgarian Empire, occasionally used to describe the Kingdom of Bulgaria (1908–1946)
Third Persian Empire, sometimes used to describe the Sassanid Empire (ca. AD 224–651)
3rd Empire Awards, film awards held in 1998

See also 
First Empire (disambiguation)
Second Empire (disambiguation)